Francesco Marcolini (born 1 June 1971) is an Italian former sailor, who specialized in the multihull (Tornado) class. Together with his partner Edoardo Bianchi, he was named one of the country's top sailors in the mixed multihull catamaran for two consecutive Olympic editions (2004 and 2008), finishing each in the top ten, respectively. A member of Yacht Club Italiano in his native Genoa, Marcolini trained most of his competitive sailing career under the tutelage of his personal coach and Barcelona 1992 Olympian Angelo Glisoni.

Marcolini made his Olympic debut in Athens 2004, sailing with the 19-year-old crew member Bianchi in the Tornado class. There, the Italian duo rocketed to a solid tenth overall spot against a 17-boat fleet at the end of eleven-race series, accumulating a net grade of 78 points.

At the 2008 Summer Olympics in Beijing, Marcolini competed for the second time with Bianchi in the Tornado class. Building up their Olympic selection, the Italian duo finished a credible eleventh in the golden fleet phase to lock one of the eleven quota places offered at the 2007 ISAF Worlds in Cascais, Portugal. Started the race series in last place, Marcolini and Bianchi stormed their way from behind with a powerful runner-up mark and a couple of fourths recorded to enter the medal round. Tricky wind conditions, however, witnessed the Italians' medal chances fade on the final race, plummeting them further to seventh overall with 74 net points.

References

External links
 
 
 
 

1971 births
Living people
Italian male sailors (sport)
Olympic sailors of Italy
Sailors at the 2004 Summer Olympics – Tornado
Sailors at the 2008 Summer Olympics – Tornado
Sportspeople from Genoa